The GLAAD Stephen F. Kolzak Award is a special GLAAD Media Award presented annually by the Gay & Lesbian Alliance Against Defamation. It is named in honor of the Los Angeles casting director Stephen F. Kolzak, who devoted the last part of his life to fighting homophobia and AIDS-phobia within the entertainment industry. The award is given to an openly LGBT member of the entertainment or media community for his or her work toward eliminating homophobia.  It has been awarded since 1991, with Kolzak being the posthumous inaugural recipient.

List of recipients
 1991 - Stephen F. Kolzak (posthumous)
 1992 - Paul Monette and Lillian Faderman
 1993 - Sir Ian McKellen
 1994 - none
 1995 - Pedro Zamora
 1996 - none
 1997 - Bruce Vilanch
 1998 - Ellen DeGeneres
 1999 - Melissa Etheridge and Julie Cypher
 2000 - Anne Heche
 2001 - Paris Barclay
 2002 - Alan Ball
 2003 - Todd Haynes
 2004 - John Waters
 2005 - Bill Condon
 2006 - Melissa Etheridge
 2007 - Martina Navratilova
 2008 - Rufus Wainwright
 2009 - Gene Robinson
 2010 - Wanda Sykes
 2011 - Robert Greenblatt
 2012 - Chaz Bono
 2013 - Steve Warren (attorney)
 2014 - Laverne Cox
 2015 - Roland Emmerich
 2016 - Ruby Rose
 2017 - Troye Sivan
 2018 - Jim Parsons
 2019 - Sean Hayes
 2020 - Janet Mock
 2022 - Michaela Jaé Rodriguez

References

External links
 Official GLAAD Media Awards website

Stephen F. Kolzak Award